Ado Ekiti is the capital city of Ekiti State, Nigeria. It is the headquarter of the Ekiti central senatorial district, southwest, Nigeria.

History
Ado Ewi is an ancient city, founded by Ewi Awamaro the son of Biritikolu. Awamaro (the restless one) left Ile-Ife with his father Ewi Apa Biritikolu and his uncle Oranmiyan to both Ita Orogun and Benin respectively after staying briefly with Oloba in Oba-Ile, in present day Akure.

Both Oranmiyan (Oba of Benin) and Biritikolu first settled in Benin forests before disputes among their people led them to separate and Biritikolu sought a new home westward at Utamodi (Oke Papa). Ewi Biritikolu and one of his sons reigned there. It was Ewi Awamaro who migrated to Ilesun (Present day Ado-Ekiti) after staying briefly at Udoani (Ido Ani) and Agbado during the long migration. When Ewi Awamaro left Agbado, some elders remained behind to rest and gave the settlement the name Agba Ado (Elders’ Camp) – Agbado-Ekiti as the town is known today.

Population and demographics
The population in 2006 was 308,621. The people of Ado Ekiti are mainly of the Ekiti sub-ethnic group of the Yoruba.

Education
Ado Ekiti City has a State owned University - the University of Ado Ekiti now Ekiti State University Ado-Ekiti, a privately owned University - Afe Babalola University Ado-Ekiti, a Polytechnic - the Federal Polytechnic, Ado-Ekiti, Federal University Oye, (FUOYE), Oye-Ekiti, privately owned polytechnic Crown polytechnic, Odo, Ado-Ekiti

Media and economy
In Ado Ekiti, there are local television and radio stations such as Nigeria Television Authority Ado Ekiti, Ekiti State Television (BSES), and Radio Ekiti. Various commercial enterprises operate in Ado Ekiti. The city is the trade centre for a farming region where yams, cassava, grain, and tobacco are grown. Cotton is also grown for weaving.

Traditional leader
The current Ewi, or ruler, of Ado Ekiti is Rufus Aladesanmi III, who succeeded Samuel Adeyemi George-Adelabu I in 1990.

Gallery

References

External links

 A Panoramic View of Ado Ekiti in the 19th Century

Local Government Areas in Ekiti State
State capitals in Nigeria
Cities in Yorubaland